Steven P. Bradley is an American politician and dentist serving as a member of the Iowa House of Representatives from the 66th district. Elected in November 2020, he assumed office on January 11, 2021.

Early life and education 
Bradley was born in Napa, California while his father was serving in the United States Air Force. He later lived in Epworth, Iowa. After graduating from Western Dubuque High School, Bradley attended Loras College and the University of Dubuque before earning a bachelor's degree from the University of Iowa. He earned a dental degree from the Marquette University School of Dentistry.

Career 
Outside of politics, Bradley works as a dentist. He was elected to the Iowa House of Representatives in November 2020 and assumed office on January 11, 2021. Bradley also serves as vice chair of the House Human Resources Committee.

References 

Living people
People from Napa, California
People from Epworth, Iowa
University of Iowa alumni
Marquette University alumni
Republican Party members of the Iowa House of Representatives
American dentists
Year of birth missing (living people)